Hércules de Brito Ruas, (born 9 August 1939 in Rio de Janeiro), known as Brito, is a former Brazilian footballer. He played as a central defender for several clubs, and for the Brazil national team.

Career 
In 1975, he played abroad in the National Soccer League with Montreal Castors.

National team
Brito has 45 caps with the Brazil national team between 1964 and 1972.

He won the 1970 FIFA World Cup with the Brazil national team. He also played the 1966 FIFA World Cup (one game against Portugal).

Honours

Club
 Rio de Janeiro State championship: 1956
 Rio-São Paulo: 1966
 Taça Guanabara: 1965

International
Brazil
 FIFA World Cup: 1970
 Roca Cup: 1971
 Brazil Independence Cup: 1972

Individual
Placars Bola de Prata (Silver Ball): 1970

References

External links
Brito Caps Record
Honours of Brito

1939 births
Living people
Brazilian expatriate footballers
Association football central defenders
Sport Club Internacional players
CR Vasco da Gama players
CR Flamengo footballers
Cruzeiro Esporte Clube players
Botafogo de Futebol e Regatas players
Sport Club Corinthians Paulista players
Campeonato Brasileiro Série A players
Montreal Castors players
1966 FIFA World Cup players
1970 FIFA World Cup players
FIFA World Cup-winning players
Brazil international footballers
Expatriate footballers in Venezuela
Footballers from Rio de Janeiro (city)
Brazilian footballers
Canadian National Soccer League players
Brazilian expatriate sportspeople in Venezuela
Brazilian expatriate sportspeople in Canada
Expatriate soccer players in Canada